Larry B. Butler is an American politician serving as a member of the Connecticut House of Representatives from the 72nd district. He assumed office in 2007.

Early life and education 
Butler was born and raised in Waterbury, Connecticut. He studied political science at Central Connecticut State University for two years and also attended the Computer Processing Institute.

Career 
Prior to entering politics, Butler worked as a software engineer. He served as a member of the Waterbury Board of Aldermen from 1997 to 2006. He was elected to the Connecticut House of Representatives in November 2006 and assumed office in 2007. During the 2017 legislative session, Butler served as co-chair of the House Housing Committee. He is also vice chair of the National Black Caucus of State Legislators for the first region.

References 

Living people
Politicians from Waterbury, Connecticut
Democratic Party members of the Connecticut House of Representatives
African-American state legislators in Connecticut
Year of birth missing (living people)
21st-century African-American people